Order of Freedom is the highest decoration of Bosnia and Herzegovina. It is awarded for special merits in realization of freedom and human rights, for development of understanding and trust between citizens and people of Bosnia and Herzegovina, and for merits in construction of democratic relations. Order was established in 1994.

Sources
 Zakon o odlikovanjima Bosne i Hercegovine made on May 21, 2003.

Orders, decorations, and medals of Bosnia and Herzegovina
Awards established in 1994